Greenville Township may refer to the following townships in the United States:

 Greenville Township, Bureau County, Illinois
 Greenville Township, Floyd County, Indiana
 Greenville Township, New Jersey
 Greenville Township, LaMoure County, North Dakota
 Greenville Township, Darke County, Ohio
 Greenville Township, Somerset County, Pennsylvania